Ireland–Mexico relations are the foreign relations between Ireland and Mexico. The relationship has been often associated with the Irish migration to Mexico. Both nations are members of the Organisation for Economic Co-operation and Development, and World Trade Organization.

History
During Spanish colonization of Mexico, several Spanish Viceroys were of Irish descent such as Juan O'Donojú who was the last Spanish Viceroy. Since Mexican independence, many Irish have immigrated to Mexico and have contributed to its culture and development. During the Mexican–American War (1846–1848), many Irish immigrants in the United States abandoned their posts and joined Mexican forces because of discrimination and persecution of their Catholic faith by protestant Americans. One of the most popular Irish battalions during the war was that of the St. Patrick's Battalion which fought on the Mexican side during the Battle of Buena Vista and Battle of Churubusco in 1847, among others.

On 10 January 1974, both nations established diplomatic relations. At first, Mexico was accredited to Ireland from its embassy in London and Ireland was accredited to Mexico from its embassy in Washington, DC. In 1990, both nations agreed to open resident diplomatic missions and in June 1991, Mexico opened its embassy on Raglan Road, Dublin and Ireland followed suit by opening its embassy in Mexico City in September 1999.

On 20 March 2013, Irish President Michael D. Higgins and then Mexican President Enrique Peña Nieto held a bilateral meeting in Rome, the day after the papal inauguration of Pope Francis. Peña Nieto invited Higgins to visit Mexico, and the Irish president began a four-day official visit on 19 October 2013 as part of a three-nation trip to Central America.

In 2015, both nations celebrated 40 years since the establishment of diplomatic relations between both countries. In 2017, both nations held their 6th bilateral consultation in matters of mutual interest in Dublin.Bilateral relations between Mexico and Ireland (in Spanish)

In October 2022, Mexican Foreign Undersecretary, Carmen Moreno Toscano, paid a visit to Ireland to attend the VIII political consultation reunion between both nations. During the reunion, both nations agreed on deepening bilateral collaboration on issues such as health, trade and investment promotion, diaspora and international migration.

High-level visits

High-level visits from Ireland to Mexico
 Foreign Minister Gerry Collins (1991)
 Taoiseach Albert Reynolds (1994)
 President Mary McAleese (1999)
 Taoiseach Bertie Ahern (2003, 2004)
 Foreign Minister Micheál Martin (2009)
 President Michael D. Higgins (2013)

High-level visits from Mexico to Ireland
 Foreign Minister Fernando Solana (1990, 1992)
 Foreign Undersecretary Andrés Rozental Gutman (April & May 1991)
 Foreign Undersecretary Javier Barros Valero (1992)
 Foreign Minister Rosario Green (1999)
 President Vicente Fox (2002)
 Foreign Undersecretary Lourdes Aranda Bezaury (2006, 2010)
 Minister of Health Salomón Chertorivski Woldenberg (2012)
 Minister of the Economy Idelfonso Guajardo (2014)
 Foreign Undersecretary Carlos de Icaza (2017)
 Foreign Undersecretary Carmen Moreno Toscano (2022)

Bilateral agreements
Both nations have signed several bilateral agreements such as an Agreement on the Avoidance of Double-Taxation and Tax Evasion (1998); Agreement on Educational and Cultural Cooperation (1999); Memorandum of Understanding for the Establishment of a Mechanism of Consultation in Matters of Mutual Interest (2006); Memorandum of Understanding for Cooperation between the Mexican Secretariat of Foreign Affairs and Trinity College Dublin (2003) and an Agreement of Cooperation between Dublin and Mexico City (2015).

Trade
In 1997, Mexico signed a Free Trade Agreement with the European Union (which includes Ireland). Mexico was Ireland's 21st largest export market in 2007. In 2018, two-way trade between both nations amounted to US$2.1 billion. Ireland's main exports to Mexico include: pharmaceutical and health products such as medicines, machines and chemicals; milk based products and electronics while Mexico's main exports to Ireland include: artery and veins prosthetics, alcohol (beer), lemons, airplane parts and circuits. In 2008, the Irish Government opened an Enterprise Ireland office in Mexico. Irish multinational companies such as Kerry Group, Ryanair and Smurfit Kappa operate in Mexico. Mexican multinational company Cemex operates in Ireland.

Drug trafficking
In 2013, Europol claimed that "Mexican drug cartels are targeting Ireland and mainland Europe for their cocaine and cannabis trade" and that there was "evidence of Mexican cartels using Ireland as a staging post for bringing drug shipments into Europe."

In 2016, it was revealed that Irish gangland leader Christy Kinahan was working with the Sinaloa cartel to import cocaine from Peru.

Resident diplomatic missions
 Ireland has an embassy in Mexico City.
 Mexico has an embassy in Dublin.

See also 
Irish immigration to Mexico
San Patricio, Jalisco

References

External links
 Mexican Ministry of Foreign Affairs on diplomatic relations between Mexico and Ireland 

 
Bilateral relations of Mexico
Mexico